Progona is a genus of moths in the subfamily Arctiinae.

Species
 Progona pallida Möschler, 1890
 Progona sadima Schaus, 1896
 Progona venata Schaus, 1921
 Progona xanthura Schaus, 1899
 Progona luridipennis Burmeister, 1878

References

Natural History Museum Lepidoptera generic names catalog

Lithosiini
Moth genera